Harperia is a group of plants in the Restionaceae described as a genus in 1904. The entire genus is endemic to the State of Western Australia.

 Species
 Harperia confertospicata (Steud.) B.G.Briggs & L.A.S.Johnson
 Harperia eyreana B.G.Briggs & L.A.S.Johnson
 Harperia ferruginipes Meney & Pate
 Harperia lateriflora W.Fitzg.

 Name in homonymic genus
In 1905, Rose applied the name Harperia to a plant in the Apiaceae, thus creating an illegitimate homonym. He also created one species name within his genus, i.e.
 Harperia nodosa Rose, syn of Harperella nodosa (Rose) Rose or Ptilimnium nodosum (Rose) Mathias or Carum nodosum (Rose) Koso-Pol.

References

Restionaceae
Poales genera
Endemic flora of Australia